Timothée Franchère (c. 1790 – October 5, 1849) was a Canadien businessman and political figure.

He was born around 1790. Franchère was a merchant at Saint-Mathias, Lower Canada. He served in the local militia during the War of 1812 and became captain in 1821. He was appointed commissioner in charge of construction of the Chambly Canal in 1832 and also served as a school commissioner. He participated in the Lower Canada Rebellion and fled to the United States with Louis Marchand. He was granted a pardon by the Governor late in 1837. He was reinstated as commissioner for the Chambly Canal in 1840. He was also a director of La Banque du Peuple. Franchère ran unsuccessfully for the Legislative Assembly of the Province of Canada in Rouville in 1841; he was elected there in an 1843 by-election and reelected in the 1844 general election.

He died at Saint-Mathias in 1849.

His brother Joseph also served in the assembly.

External links

Members of the Legislative Assembly of the Province of Canada from Canada East
1790s births
1849 deaths
Year of birth uncertain
People from Montérégie